The Bel Air Building is a skyscraper in the town of Puerto de la Cruz, Tenerife, Canary Islands, Spain. It is the fourth tallest building on the island of Tenerife, after the twin Santa Cruz Towers and Tres de Mayo Avenue Skyscraper, both in Santa Cruz, the island's capital.

Built in 1960, it began as a hotel of American innovation. Twenty years later it became private residential apartments.

See also 
 List of tallest buildings in Canary Islands

References 

Puerto de la Cruz
Residential buildings completed in 1960
Buildings and structures in Tenerife
Residential skyscrapers in Spain
Companies of the Canary Islands